Ernest May may refer to:

 Ernest May (athlete) (1878–1952), British track and field athlete who competed in the 1908 Summer Olympics
 Ernest R. May (1928–2009), American historian of international relations

See also
 Ernst May (1886–1970), German architect and city planner